D@bbe is a 2006 Turkish horror film directed and written by Hasan Karacadağ. Its title is a reference to the Dabbe.

Plot
People start to commit suicide using brutal techniques. Starting from the United States of America, this suicide wave spreads all over the earth. In a small town, a man kills himself after long time he spends on the computer. Following this man's death, his  friends start to get e-mails from him. They also start seeing strange creatures around themselves. This is just the beginning of the doomsday.

References

External links
 

2006 films
2006 horror films
Exorcism in Islam
Films set in Turkey
Turkish horror films
Genies in film